The 2021–22 Tottenham Hotspur F.C. Women season was the club's 37th season in existence and their third in the FA Women's Super League, the highest level of the football pyramid. Along with competing in the WSL, the club also contested two domestic cup competitions: the FA Cup and the League Cup.

Squad

Preseason

FA Women's Super League

Results summary

Results by matchday

Results

League table

Women's FA Cup 

As a member of the first tier, Tottenham Hotspur entered the FA Cup in the fourth round proper.

FA Women's League Cup

Group stage

Knockout stage

Squad statistics

Appearances 

Starting appearances are listed first, followed by substitute appearances after the + symbol where applicable. Players listed with no appearances have been in the matchday squad but only as unused substitutes.

|-
|colspan="12"|Players away from the club on loan:

|}

Goalscorers 

The list is sorted by shirt number when total goals are equal.

Clean sheets
The list is sorted by shirt number when total clean sheets are equal.

Transfers

Transfers in

Loans in

Transfers out

Loans Out

References 

Tottenham Hotspur